Many Antarctic research stations support satellite field camps which are, in general, seasonal camps. The type of field camp can vary – some are permanent structures used during the annual Antarctic summer, whereas others are little more than tents used to support short term activities. Field camps are used for many things, from logistics (Sky Blu) to dedicated scientific research (WAIS Divide Field Camp).

List of field camps

See also

Research stations in Antarctica
Demographics of Antarctica
List of Antarctic expeditions
Transport in Antarctica

References

 
 

 
Field camps